The Ashana Game Reserve is a protected area in South Sudan, Africa. It is both a game reserve and an Important Bird Area. The   savannah woodland habitat features key species of elephant and giant eland.

References

Game reserves of South Sudan
Important Bird Areas of South Sudan